The Republican Alliance for Democracy is an opposition political party in Djibouti, founded by Ahmed Dini Ahmed. In the parliamentary election held on 10 January 2003, the party was part of the Union for a Democratic Change (Union pour l'Alternance Démocratique), which won 37.3% of the popular vote but no seats in the National Assembly.

External links
 Official website

Political parties in Djibouti